The Dutch Eerste Divisie in the 1983–84 season was contested by 17 teams, one more than in the previous season. This was due to RBC Roosendaal, entering from the amateurs. MVV won the championship.

New entrants
Entered from amateur football
 RBC Roosendaal
Relegated from the 1982–83 Eredivisie
 NAC Breda
 NEC
 FC Twente

League standings

Promotion competition
In the promotion competition, four period winners (the best teams during each of the four quarters of the regular competition) played for promotion to the eredivisie.

See also
 1983–84 Eredivisie
 1983–84 KNVB Cup

References
Netherlands - List of final tables (RSSSF)

Eerste Divisie seasons
2
Neth